Metribolone (developmental code R1881, also known as methyltrienolone) is a synthetic and orally active anabolic–androgenic steroid (AAS) and a 17α-alkylated nandrolone (19-nortestosterone) derivative which was never marketed for medical use but has been widely used in scientific research as a hot ligand in androgen receptor (AR) ligand binding assays (LBAs) and as a photoaffinity label for the AR. More precisely, metribolone is the 17α-methylated derivative of trenbolone. It was investigated briefly for the treatment of advanced breast cancer in women in the late 1960s and early 1970s, but was found to produce signs of severe hepatotoxicity at very low dosages, and its development was subsequently discontinued.

Medical uses
Metribolone was never approved for medical use, a situation unlikely to change given its liver toxicity even at low doses. It was studied for the potential treatment of advanced breast cancer in women but development was abandoned.

Side effects

Side effects of metribolone include virilization and hepatotoxicity among others.

Pharmacology

Pharmacodynamics
Metribolone is an AAS, or an agonist of the AR, with both anabolic and androgenic activity. It is one of the most potent AAS to have ever been synthesized, with 120 to 300 times the oral anabolic potency and 60 to 70 times the androgenic potency of the reference AAS methyltestosterone in castrated male rats, although the same level of potency has not been observed in studies in humans. In addition to the AR, metribolone has high affinity for the progesterone receptor (PR), and binds to the glucocorticoid receptor (GR) as well. The drug was also identified in 2007 as a potent antimineralocorticoid, with similar affinity for the mineralocorticoid receptor as aldosterone and spironolactone. In addition, metribolone was identified in 2010 as a potent inhibitor of 3β-hydroxysteroid dehydrogenase (3β-HSD) 1 and 2 (IC50 = 0.02 and 0.16 μM, respectively). On the basis of this finding, it has been said that metribolone should be used very cautiously in scientific research, taking into account 3β-HSD inhibition to avoid erroneous interpretation.

Metribolone has a high potential for hepatotoxicity, similarly to other 17α-alkylated AAS. However, the hepatotoxic potential of metribolone appears to be exceptionally high, likely in relation to its very high potency and metabolic stability; in a study of treatment with the drug for advanced breast cancer, severe hepatic dysfunction was observed at very low dosages.

Pharmacokinetics
Metribolone has very low affinity for human serum sex hormone-binding globulin (SHBG), less than 5% of that of testosterone and less than 1% of that of dihydrotestosterone (DHT).

Chemistry

Metribolone, also known as 17α-methyltrenbolone, as well as 17α-methyl-δ9,11-19-nortestosterone or 17α-methylestra-4,9,11-trien-17β-ol-3-one, is a synthetic estrane steroid and a 17α-alkylated derivative of nandrolone (19-nortestosterone). It is the C17α methylated derivative of trenbolone (δ9,11-19-nortestosterone) and the C9- and C11-dehydrogenated (δ9,11) analogue of normethandrone (17α-methyl-19-nortestosterone). Other close relatives and derivatives of metribolone include mibolerone (7α,17α-dimethyl-19-nortestosterone) and dimethyltrienolone (RU-2420; 7α,17α-dimethyl-δ9,11-19-nortestosterone). In addition to AAS, trimethyltrienolone (R2956; 2α,2β,17α-trimethyl-δ9,11-19-nortestosterone), a highly potent antiandrogen, has been derived from metribolone.

History
Metribolone was first described in the literature in 1965. It was studied clinically in the late 1960s and early 1970s, most notably in the treatment of advanced breast cancer. The drug was found to be effective and showed weak androgenicity, but also produced severe signs of hepatotoxicity, and was ultimately never marketed. By the mid-1970s, metribolone was becoming an accepted standard as a ligand and agonist of the AR in scientific research. It remains in wide use for this purpose today. Aside from scientific research, metribolone has also been encountered as an AAS in non-medical contexts, for instance in doping in sports and bodybuilding.

Society and culture

Generic names
Metribolone is the generic name of metribolone and its . It is also known by the name methyltrienolone and its developmental code names R1881, R-1881, RU-1881, and RU1881, and is very commonly referred to by these other names rather than as metribolone in the scientific literature.

Doping in sports
Prior to the 2008 Beijing Olympic Games, 11 members of the Greek national weightlifting team and 4 Greek track and field athletes tested positive for metribolone.

References

External links
 
 Methyltrienolone - William Llewellyn's Anabolic.org 

3β-Hydroxysteroid dehydrogenase inhibitors
Tertiary alcohols
Androgens and anabolic steroids
Antimineralocorticoids
Estranes
Glucocorticoids
Hepatotoxins
Enones
Progestogens
World Anti-Doping Agency prohibited substances
Abandoned drugs